Vaishnavi Sundar (born 8 June 1986) is an Indian independent filmmaker and activist.

Her latest film: Dysphoric: Fleeing Womanhood Like a House on Fire is a four-part documentary series on "gender identity ideology", and she said screenings of the film have been cancelled following allegations of transphobia. In 2018, she produced and directed a documentary on Workplace sexual harassment called But What Was She Wearing?. Her films have been screened in several Indian and international festivals. She founded Women Making Films. She has written, directed, and produced all her films under her own production company, Lime Soda Films.

Early life 
Vaishnavi was born on 8 June 1986 in Avadi, a suburb in the state of Tamil Nadu. She did her schooling there and went on to getting her bachelor's degree in commerce at Ethiraj College for Women, Chennai. She did her post-graduation in business administration from Anna University in Chennai. She attended the International Visitor Leadership Program.

Vaishnavi started out with acting under Theatre Nisha, a Chennai-based centre of drama. She gradually moved on to directing and writing plays too. She attended "The Actor's Voice" by Bill Wright at Royal Conservatoire of Scotland, Glasgow. She also attended a physical theatre workshop under Anita Santhanam, a graduate of London International School of Performing Arts. While she started acting in films from 2010, her decision to make her own came in 2013 when she started making Pava.

Career

As an actress 
Vaishnavi initiated her acting career in association with Theatre Nisha. In the course of 7 years she has acted in a variety of plays viz., The Pregnant King, The Red Queens of the Black Night, Siri Sampige, The Particle Collider and Fire and the Rain etc. She won the award for best actress for her lead role in The Particle Collider. In the later years, she directed four plays – To Write my Epitaph, The Lilac Ticket, A Beautiful Mind and Chitrangada (A Monologue), two of which won her the best director and play of the day award by Short and Sweet. Of the four, she wrote and produced A Beautiful Mind and Chitrangada, herself. Vaishnavi has also performed at the prestigious Soorya festival and at Rangashankara's Sampriti Festival.

As a voice artist, her work appeared in regionally hosted television series, including Nickelodeon cartoons Ninja Hattori, Perman and a Korean feature film Tidal Wave (2009).

As a filmmaker 
Vaishnavi began her filmmaking career in 2014 when she made her debut film Pava, a story about the metamorphosis of the relationship between a young girl and a barber. Pava has made its way to many film festivals across the country and the abroad, including places like Slovenia, Afghanistan and New York. Her second film, The Catalyst came in 2015 which was a crowd-funded project raised from an independent fundraiser unlike Kickstarter or Indiegogo. The film was inspired by the story 'Taxi Driver' written by the Indian writer Kartar Singh Duggal. The Catalyst has since been a subject matter of discussion and learning among colleges and film clubs. Vaishnavi has conducted many workshops on the topic and she has also written at length about the process of finishing the film by making all the resources available for free, in the film's website. During August 2015, she directed a documentary on Palaeontology titled Unearthing The Treasures of Ariyalur. This project that focused on the fossils discovered in Ariyalur, a small village in Tamil Nadu went on to become the first ever Indian documentary on fossils and drew positive attention of Palaeontology professionals from all over the world. During a short trip to Gangtok, Sikkim, Vaishnavi made a short documentary on the life of a female traffic cop by name Anju Chetri and called it Aage Jake Left. The film focuses on the Northeastern Indian women's admirable grit. This film was screened at the London Feminist Film Festival, and Pakistan International Women's Film Festival.

Her film, But what was she wearing, is a documentary on workplace sexual harassment in India which examines the Sexual Harassment at Workplace Act of 2013, and "juxtaposes the expectations and realities of seeking redressal" for such crimes under this Act. The film has received reviews from leading media outlets including The News Minute, Scroll, Newslaundry, The Quint, Silverscreen.in, Vikatan, Theekathir and Indian Express to name a few. The film has since been screened in five cities including Chennai, Hyderabad, Pune, Mumbai

In January 2021, she conceived, directed and edited a four-part documentary series during COVID lockdown called: 'Dysphoric: Fleeing Womanhood Like a House on Fire''' made entirely via video conferencing software. In this dystopian world where misogyny is rampant, and womanhood is commodified, being female comes at a cost. Corporates capitalise on women's bodies blurring the lines of biological sex, and profiting from the empirically untested pseudo-science of queer theory. This gaslighting is aided by the complicity of media, academia, legal and the political world. It is no surprise that young girls are fleeing womanhood like a house on fire.

The past decade has seen a steep rise in the number of young girls seeking to transition by undergoing life threatening, irreversible procedures. 'Dysphoric' is a four-part documentary series on the rise of Gender Identity Ideology, its effects on women and girls – especially in developing countries. The film explores gender transition, the permanent medical side-effects of hormones and surgeries, the propaganda by 'woke' corporations that glorifies thousands of stereotypical gender presentations coalesced as fashion, a surge in pronoun policing; language hijacking that calls women ‘menstruators’, and the many hurdles women face while trying to question this modern-day misogyny. The film amplifies the voices of detransitioners, clinicians, psychiatrists, sociologists, feminists, academics and concerned citizens.

 As a writer 
Vaishnavi is a published writer and has written on diverse topics themed under films, feminism and the epoch of social justice community in India. Starting from the intersection of feminist ideology and filmmaking, Vaishnavi has written articles that have been published on platforms like Women's Voices Now and, The Hindu. For other topics related to women's issues, she is a regular freelancing contributor to TheNewsminute, Scroll, The Ladies Finger, Firstpost, The Swaddle, Provoke Magazine, Worldpulse Silverscree.in, Ozy etc.

 As a curator, speaker and adjudicator 
During March 2016, Vaishnavi spoke on progressive filmmaking, as a mentor in Vital Voices Global Mentoring Walk – Chennai Chapter. Later, she was invited as a speaker at a major conference on alternative cinema: marketing, promotion & release organised by Indiearth Xchange. She was also an adjudicator for Women's Voices Now- a US-based platform advocating for women's rights through films and has curated various International film festivals across the country, involving a special package of films made by women. The recent ones were in Madurai and Chennai. In November 2017, Vaishnavi was invited as a Springboard Sessions Speaker at Samagra 2017, an annual event organised by the Melton Foundation at the BMS College of Engineering. She periodically guest lectures at premier educational institutions like the IIT Madras on Cinema, Feminism and equality. In November 2018, Vaishnavi was invited by Gender at Work to speak as a panelist on "Bridging the Gender Gap at Workplace", held at Goethe Zentrum, Hyderabad. The Rotract Club of Women's Christian College, Chennai invited Vaishnavi as a panelist for their event, Stree Suraksha where she opined on "Relationship between media culture and sexual harassment." The All India Democratic Women's Association frequently invites Vaishnavi to speak at various grassroots events across Tamil Nadu. She also serves as a speaker and adjudicator of a variety of online events, film festivals regularly.

 As an activist 

Vaishnavi's work as a feminist activist started from a campaign she initiated against a Tamil magazine which described women's leggings as "obscene", on social media with the trending hashtag #OurClothesOurChoice which eventually compelled them to take-down the online version of the magazine. Her next noticeable work involves a campaign against the glorification of crimes against women in Tamil cinema. Along with Iswarya, a Chennai-based researcher, Vaishnavi participated in discussions at various place and also produced a video stressing on its dangers, asking people to boycott films that glorify stalking and male violence against women.

Reproductive rights in India draw in her most recent work, which includes advocating for emergency contraceptive pills to be available over-the-counter in the state of Tamil Nadu. The ban of over-the-counter ECP has been in place for 10 years and her petition requesting the government to lift the ban went viral which so far has received more than 1500 signatures. For this, she won a story award by World Pulse.

In November 2017, Vaishnavi was invited by Al Jazeera to be in a panel discussing controversial Bollywood film Padmavati. Vaishnavi put forth her arguments about the need for a recourse that looks into real issues like poverty, rape and a dearth of safe space for women in India, rather than glorify fringe elements that vandalise and murder in the name of Indian culture. This was broadcast live from Washington DC by The Stream, a social media community with its own daily TV show on Al Jazeera English.

Through her film, But What Was She Wearing? which touches upon the rampant sexual harassment of women in the unorganised sectors such as construction and farm labour, highlighting a lack of structure for redressal that one finds in larger corporate firms, she endeavoured to educate (through collaborations with organisations and NGO) women about their rights by screening the film in small towns of India. Through this film, Vaishnavi's team hopes to get the attention of policy-makers and force amendments in the Sexual Harassment of Women at Workplace (Prevention, Prohibition and Redressal) Act'', 2013, in order to make the law more potent and practical, instead of the toothless paper-legislation that it is today. The film is already scheduled to screen in multiple colleges in India as part of the sensitisation program in these educational institutes. Since the first screening of the film in Chennai, many corporate heads have approached the team to screen the film at their workplace for their employees.

Transgender people
Vaishnavi is now advocating "sex-based rights" in collaboration with the Women's Human Rights Campaign (WHRC), an anti-transgender group.

She has said screenings of her film have been cancelled following allegations of transphobia.

Other activities 
Women Making Films is a recently launched website founded by Vaishnavi. A product of her feminist activism and approach towards cinema and an attempt to condemn the blatant gender disparity in the film industry. It was established on the notion that there was no community in India empowering women filmmakers. The forum is dedicated to establishing an appreciable connectivity among women filmmakers within India as well as the world. This not-for-profit community was built to create an online campus for the promotion of female filmmakers, their works etc. through blogs, workshops and mentorship programs and many more such avenues.

In the course of one year since its launch, this website has gathered a vast number of popular and influential women working in Indian and world cinema in its members list including Debalina Majumdar, Annupamaa, Iram Parveen Bilal, Revathy S. Varmha and Beena Sarwar. Along with a group of ground-breaking articles on the subject of cinema and tabooed aspects of society, Vaishnavi has also interviewed artists like Tannishtha Chatterjee, Megha Ramaswamy, Rajshri Deshpande, Anuradha Menon and Nina Paley. Through the platform of Women Making Films Vaishnavi has collaborated with various educational and film organisations like Goethe Institut, LaGuardia Community College and Satyajit Ray Film and Television Institute and conducted film festivals and screenings. The community's most successful event, The First Festival was an attempt to screen films made by women all over India and it is the only such event in which 15 films made by women from 7 countries were screened in 10 cities all over India. The First Festival was also widely appreciated and talked about by the media. It also generated discussions about sexism and sex-based discrimination with filmmaking, in all the places it was conducted. The First Festival brought together a number of collaborators who offered to screen films in their premises and came on to become the initial developing ground for Vaishnavi's organisation. Women Making Films has an ongoing event calendar with curated screenings, film festivals and focussed workshops throughout the year.

Women Making Films continues to be the voice of female filmmakers from around the world, with members from more than 19 countries, and 32 unique departments that they are an expert in.

Theatre

Filmography

Festivals and screenings

Dysphoric: Fleeing Womanhood Like a House on Fire 

 Released online for worldwide distribution

But What Was She Wearing? 

 Official selection – Udada International Women's Film Festival, Kenya 2018
 Official selection – Nominee (Best Film) Independent Talents International Film Festival, 2018 
Official selection – Colorado International Activism Film Festival, 2019
Official selection – 6th International Documentary Festival of Ierapetra Awards, 2019

To What End? 
 Official selection – Pitch Her Productions' Riveter Series: #MeToo, New York City, USA 2018
 Official selection competition – Women International Film Festival. Islamabad, Pakistan 2018
 Official selection – Cut the Gap! The HeForShe Vienna Gender Equality Short Film Day, Austria 2018

Aage Jake Left 
 Official selection competition – Women International Film Festival. Islamabad, Pakistan 2017
 Official selection competition – Cine Sister Women Women. Manchester, UK 2017
 Official selection competition – London Feminist Film Festival. London, UK 2017

Unearthing The Treasures Of Ariyalur 
 Official selection – International Festival of Women Filmmakers, Gauhati India 2016
 Official selection competition – International Documentary and Short Film Festival Kerala Trivandrum India 2016
 Official selection competition – Docademia's 2nd Short Documentary Contest Chicago, USA 2017

The Catalyst 
 Official selection – International Festival of Women Filmmakers, Gauhati India 2016
 Official selection – International Short Film Festival, Bangalore India 2015

Pava 
 Official selection competition – International Documentary and Short Film Festival Kerala Trivandrum 2014
 Official selection – Bangalore International Short Film Festival 2014
 Official selection competition – Alpavirama – South Asian short film festival India, Ahmadabad 2014
 Official selection – IAWRT – Asian Women's Film Festival, Delhi 2015
 Official selection – Anthropo Children's festival, Slovenia 2015
 Official selection – Under The Tin Roof Performing Arts Festival, Mumbai 2015
 Official selection – International Women Film Festival, Afghanistan 2015
 Official selection – FLO Film Festival, Mumbai 2016
 Official selection – International Festival of Women Filmmakers, Gauhati 2016
 Official selection – Women Making Films Festival, New York 2016
 Winner – Women International Film Festival. Islamabad, Pakistan 2018

See also
 List of female film and television directors

References

External links 
 http://www.wmfindia.com
 http://www.limesodafilms.com

Living people
Indian women film directors
Tamil film directors
Tamil-language film directors
Tamil screenwriters
Film directors from Chennai
21st-century Indian film directors
1986 births
Feminist artists
Screenwriters from Tamil Nadu
21st-century Indian women artists
Indian women screenwriters
Women artists from Tamil Nadu
Actresses in Malayalam cinema
Actresses in Tamil cinema